The October 2021 NBA G League draft was the 21st draft of the NBA G League.

The Delaware Blue Coats had the first overall selection after a three-team trade involving the South Bay Lakers and Memphis Hustle. The Blue Coats selected Shamorie Ponds with the first pick.

Key

Draft

First round

Second round

Third round

References 

Draft
NBA G League draft
National Basketball Association lists
NBA G League draft